Soul Ballet is a musical project of actor, producer, arranger, programmer, and multi-instrumentalist Rick Kelly. 

Soul Ballet's music is styled around contemporary smooth jazz/electronica. Soul Ballet is occasionally joined by a live rhythm section, as well as a series of guest vocalists, including Stefani Montiel, Annika, and Billy Valentine.

Discography 
 Soul Ballet (November 5, 1996 Countdown)
 Trip The Night Fantastic (June 23, 1998 Countdown)
 "City Of Desire (1999 Countdown)
 Vibe Cinema (February 22, 2000 Countdown Records)
 Dial It In (February 26, 2002 Gold Circle Records)
 dream BEAT dream (August 10, 2004 215 Records)
 All The Pretty Lights Vol. 1 (June 7, 2005 215 Records)
 Lavish (September 11, 2007 Artizen)
 2019 (August 4, 2009, NuGroove Records)

Compilation appearances
 New Age Music & New Sounds Vol. 67 – "Liberty"

References

External links 
 NuGroove artist page
 Soul Ballet on MySpace

Smooth jazz ensembles
Acid jazz ensembles